James Fox-Lane (August 1756 – 7 April 1821), known as James Fox until 1773, was an English landed gentleman, who represented Horsham in Parliament for six years.

He was the oldest son of Sackville Fox of East Horsley, Surrey, and his wife Ann Holloway. His father died in 1760 and left him his estate in Surrey, worth about £1,300 per year. Educated at Marylebone School, he was admitted to Christ's College, Cambridge in 1771 and studied there until 1774. On 22 February 1773, he inherited the Bramham Park, Yorkshire estate of his paternal uncle George Fox-Lane, 1st Baron Bingley, and subsequently took the name of Fox-Lane.

Through extravagance as a youth he became indebted to the moneylender Robert Mackreth. Mackreth bought Fox-Lane's Surrey estate very shortly after James came of age in 1777 and resold it for a handsome profit. He attempted to buy the Yorkshire estate as well, but the sale was cancelled by the Court of Chancery. Fox-Lane subsequently retained John Scott as counsel and sued Mackreth, alleging that Mackreth had defrauded him, and that the transactions had begun while Fox-Lane was still a minor. His suit was successful, and he was awarded the purchase money of the Surrey estate with interest and costs, totaling about £20,000. Mackreth appealed, but the verdict was upheld by the Lord Chancellor and, in 1791, the House of Lords.

On 23 July 1789, Fox-Lane married Hon. Marcia Lucy Pitt (1756–1822), the daughter of George Pitt, 1st Baron Rivers. They had four sons and one daughter:
George Lane-Fox (1793–1848)
William Augustus Pitt Lane-Fox (d. 11 February 1832), Grenadier Guards, married Lady Caroline Douglas, sister of George Douglas, 17th Earl of Morton, and had issue, including Augustus Pitt Rivers
Sackville Lane-Fox (1797–1874)
Rev. Thomas Henry Lane-Fox (d. 22 November 1861), vicar of Sturminster Newton
Marcia Bridget Lane-Fox (d. 10 June 1826), married Sir Edward Vavasour, 1st Baronet on 5 August 1815

On 5 May 1790, Fox-Lane was commissioned a lieutenant in the Dorsetshire Militia, of which his father-in-law was colonel.

Although he had joined Brooks's Club, famously a society of Whigs, Fox-Lane had little interest in politics. Frances, the Dowager Viscountess of Irvine, was one of his Yorkshire neighbours, and in the 1796 election, returned him for one of the seats she controlled at Horsham. No known speech or vote on his part survives, and he did not stand at the 1802 election. He died on 7 April 1821, his health having declined for some time, and left an estate worth £120,000.

References

1756 births
1821 deaths
Alumni of Christ's College, Cambridge
Members of the Parliament of Great Britain for English constituencies
British MPs 1796–1800
Members of the Parliament of the United Kingdom for English constituencies
UK MPs 1801–1802
British Militia officers
James
People from Surrey (before 1889)